Chevalier College is an independent Roman Catholic co-educational secondary day school, located in , in the Southern Highlands region of New South Wales, Australia. The College is administered by the priests and brothers of the international religious institute, the Missionaries of the Sacred Heart (MSC); and is a member of the Independent Schools Association (ISA).

Houses
Chevalier College traditionally had four houses, with their respective colours: Osbourne (yellow); Riversdale (red); Giles (blue); and Reid (green). In 2010, the house Burford (purple), was added. Father Burford, after whom the house was named, was the rector of the school from 1952 until 1956. He died on 16 February 1983. In 2011, the house Clancy (orange), was added. This house is named after Ken Clancy msc.

Sporting records
1986, Senior HICES 4 × 100 m 44.86 sec by Phillip Hall, Anthony Cipolla, Chris Scott and Ashley Goodwin. Longest standing record at the college.

Notable alumni
 John Fahey former Premier of New South Wales, former federal Finance Minister, President of the World Anti-Doping Agency
 Peter Haertsch plastic surgeon
 Peter Hartcherpolitical journalist
 Ian Irvinenovelist and marine scientist
 Michael MacConnellnovelist
 Allan McMahonAustralian former rugby league representative, Newcastle Knights coach
 Professor Geordie Williamson mathematician and the youngest living Fellow of the Royal Society

Sexual abuse

In 2021, Father Caruana was convicted of 26 offences against 12 students at the school between 1982 and 1989. Father Caruana was a teacher, dormitory master, rugby coach and bandmaster at the school during that time. He was sentenced to 15 years in prison.

See also 

 List of Catholic schools in New South Wales
 Catholic education in Australia

References

External links
 Chevalier College website
 Chevalier College Students and Friends website

Educational institutions established in 1946
Independent Schools Association (Australia)
Catholic secondary schools in New South Wales
1946 establishments in Australia
Missionaries of the Sacred Heart
Burradoo, New South Wales